Saint Turibius  of Astorga (fl. 446, died 460) was an archdeacon of Tui and an early Bishop of Astorga. Turibius was a zealous maintainer of ecclesiastical discipline, and defender of the Nicene Christianity against the Galician heresy of Priscillianism, for which he received a supportive letter from Leo the Great, which still survives.

Turibius held a local synod in 446. After his death at Astorga in 460 he was revered as a saint. According to tradition, his relics, along with a piece of the lignum crucis he had brought from Jerusalem, were transferred to the Monastery of Liébana around the middle of the eighth century. His feast day is April 16 in the Roman Catholic Church. He is usually portrayed with a mitre and is not to be confused with Turibius of Liébana.

Notes

Bibliography

External links
Catholic Online: Turibius of Astorga
Año Jubilar Lebaniego: Santo Toribio, Obispo
Santo Toribio de Astorga, aproximación a una biografía

460 deaths
People from Astorga, Spain
Saints from Hispania
5th-century deaths
Bishops of Astorga
5th-century bishops in Hispania
5th-century Christian saints
Year of birth unknown